FiXT (pronounced "fixed") is an American independent media company with several divisions including a record label, an online music store, and a film/TV/video game music licensing arm. FiXT was founded and is owned by Klayton, the sole member of the electronic rock project Celldweller.

History

FiXT started in 2006 as an outgrowth of Esion Media, the name under which Klayton published his earliest Celldweller material. After years of trouble with distributors over how to properly handle Celldweller's unique brand of music, Klayton decided to take the same approach to record labels as he did with his music and handle the matter himself.

Some of the first releases on FiXT were remix compilations for Celldweller tracks that were called the Take It & Break It series. The remixes were solicited from fans who could download and remix the song files for free. Out of this series grew FiXT Remix, a separate site that regularly hosts remix contests for artists signed to FiXT or carried in the FiXT Store.

FiXT released a remix EP for the artists lvl, as well a single for ex-Celldweller guitarist Kem Secksdiin's band Subkulture (on which Klayton was featured), and the subsequent remix album for the contest hosted by FiXT Remix. FiXT's first officially signed artist was Blue Stahli, an artist with a similar sound and one-man approach to music as Klayton. Over the next few years FiXT began expanding its record label division by signing more artists, such as Josh Money, Rockman, Atlas Plug, Moonitor & Squarehead.

In June 2012, FiXT branched out into publishing with the release of Josh Viola's five-time award-winning sci-fi/fantasy novel The Bane of Yoto. As Viola began looking for publishers for his novel, he reached out to several bands to use their music on a partnered iOS app that would feature his book in comic book format. In reaching out to Celldweller for music licensing, he got put in touch with FiXT, who published the book.

In August 2012, FiXT hosted a video game-editing contest on YouTube to help promote the release of Celldweller's Soundtrack for the Voices in My Head Vol. 2, by having gamers submit edited footage synced to the song "First Person Shooter".

As part of expansion, FiXT introduced a sublabel, FiXT Neon with focus on synthwave, indie pop, and chillwave.

In July 2021, FiXT announced a company rebrand with FiXT Radium as main label and introduced a new EDM sublabel, FiXT Noir.

Licensing
FiXT distributes and licenses music to a variety of film, TV, and video game projects.

Artists

Current FiXT artists
Klayton
Celldweller
Circle of Dust(also see Argyle Park)
Scandroid
I Will Never Be The Same
The Qemists
 The Anix
The Algorithm

Former FiXT artists
 Atlas Plug
 Blue Stahli
 lvl
 Varien

Subterra Records artists
Sebastian Komor
Adam Fielding
Varien
James Dece

References

External links
 
 YouTube channel

Electronic music record labels
Industrial record labels